Roland François Mahé C.M. (born May 1, 1940) is a Canadian theatre director from Winnipeg, Manitoba who led Le Cercle Molière for 44 years from 1968-2012. Mahé was born in St. Boniface, Manitoba in 1940 and joined Le Cercle Molière in 1960, taking over leadership in 1968 upon the retirement of director Pauline Boutal. Mahé was made a member of the order of Canada in 2017.

References

1940 births
Living people
Canadian theatre directors
People from Saint Boniface, Winnipeg
Members of the Order of Canada